Guess Who's Coming to Visit may refer to:

 "Guess Who's Coming to Visit?", an episode of the sitcom Happy Days
 "Guess Who's Coming to Visit?", an episode of the animated series Maggie and the Ferocious Beast

See also 

 Guess Who's Coming to Breakfast (disambiguation)
 Guess Who's Coming to Lunch (disambiguation)
 Guess Who's Coming to Dinner (disambiguation)
 "Guess Who's Coming to Guest Star", an episode of the television series Sonny with a Chance
 "Guess Who's Coming to Christmas", an episode of the sitcom Happy Days
 "Guess Who's Not Coming to Christmas?", an episode of the television sitcom 227
 "Guess Who's Coming to the Wedding?", an episode of the television series The Golden Girls
 Guess Who's Coming To Decorate, a television series produced by True Entertainment, a subsidiary of Endemol
 "Guess Who's Going to Be a Bride?", a two-part episode of the television series I Dream of Jeannie